Xenia Hotels & Resorts, Inc. is a real estate investment trust that invests in hotels. As of December 31, 2019, it owned 39 hotels comprising 11,245 rooms.

History
In 2014, the company was formed as a corporate spin-off of InvenTrust Properties.

On February 4, 2015, the company became a public company.

In December 2016, the company sold 4 hotels for $119 million.

In December 2019, the company sold 2 hotels for $61.5 million.

In March 2020, the company agreed to sell 7 Kimpton Hotels & Restaurants-branded hotels for $483 million.

References

External links
 
 

Hotel chains in the United States
Companies based in Florida
Resorts
Companies listed on the New York Stock Exchange
American companies established in 2014
2014 establishments in Florida